Cities is an album by The Cat Empire released on 1 April 2006. A limited release, 10,000 individually numbered copies have been made in digipak format.

At the 2006 Fine Arts Awards, the album won an ARIA Music Award under the category Best World Music Album.

The album was recorded at Sing Sing Studios in Richmond, Melbourne, Australia.

Description 
The band states the following about Cities on their website - "This project is somewhere in between a tribute to our own city and an experiment in sounds that we’ve found abroad. The approach to this record was far less precious than it was for our debut and Two Shoes. It was a kind of surprise record we almost didn’t expect to make. We wrote the material very quickly, and had an excellent and robust few weeks recording it. The record is in some ways serious and in some ways stupendous. There are ethnics, locals, sad songs, adventure songs, musical chorus’, screamers, and a collection of soul references. There are strings sections, Sitars, Tablas, horn sections, short punchy arrangements as well as some excellent solos. It is the kind of recording in which people might get to hear a different side of The Cat Empire, but it's still soulful, strange, humorous, whimsical, sometimes sad, sometimes delirious, mis-placed and undoubtedly Catempiracle as well."

Track listing

Personnel 

The Cat Empire core members
 Harry James Angus – vocals, trumpet, backing vocals
 Will Hull-Brown – drums
 Jamshid Khadiwhala – turntables, tambourine
 Ollie McGill – piano, keyboard, Hammond organ, melodica, backing vocals
 Ryan Monro – double bass, bass guitar, backing vocals
 Felix Riebl – lead vocals, percussion, backing vocals

The Empire Horns (auxiliary members)
 Ross Irwin – trumpet, flugelhorn, backing vocals
 Kieran Conrau – trombone, backing vocals
 Carlo Barbaro – tenor saxophone, baritone saxophone, flute

Additional musicians
 violin – Alyssa Conrau
 cello – Kristy Conrau
 guitar – Novak Conrad
 tablas – Bobby Singh (tracks 1-2)
 sitar – Kumar Shome (track 1)
 tambourine – Greg Sheehan (track 11)
 vocals – Julie O'Hara (tracks 4-5, 7, 10-12); Nina Ferro (tracks 4-5, 10-11)

Recording details
 Produced by – Felix Riebl, The Cat Empire
 Mixing – Adam Rhodes
 Recording – Adam Rhodes
 Arranged by – Ross Irwin, Ollie McGill (track 3)
 Mastering – Ross Cockle
 Assistant engineering – Russel Fawkus

Charts

References

Cities – CD Reviews (The Age)
musichead.com.au

The Cat Empire albums
2006 albums
ARIA Award-winning albums